Gibbs High School is a public high school of the Pinellas County School District in St. Petersburg, Florida. Gibbs is home to the Pinellas County Center for the Arts (PCCA), Business, Economics, and Technology Academy (BETA) and their television production in Communication Arts. The school is named for Jonathan Clarkson Gibbs, a black man who was Superintendent of Public Instruction and Secretary of State in Florida during the Reconstruction era.
Gibbs' current principal is Barry Brown.

History 
Before Gibbs opened in 1927, Pinellas County had no school for blacks past 6th grade. Families wishing for high school education had to enroll in private, mostly church-run black schools. Gibbs became the county's first public secondary school for blacks, occupying an eight-classroom building that cost $49,490 to build. Proms were held at the Manhattan Casino.

In 1966, Gibbs won the black state high school basketball championship. For the 1966–1967 school year, Gibbs became the first black school to join the FHSAA and compete against white schools. In their first year (1967), Gibbs won the basketball state championship.

In 1970, public schools in Florida were integrated, and whites began attending Gibbs. Gibbs, however, was still primarily black. To assist their integration goals, the district approved the creation of a magnet program at Gibbs, the Pinellas County Center for the Arts, that would instruct those with artistic gifts. In 2004, Gibbs High School was included in the federal grant received by Pinellas County Schools for the establishment of small learning communities (SLCs). Today, the high school is host to smaller learning communities that have curriculum pathways in Communication Arts, Travel & Tourism, Global Studies and a freshmen Renaissance program. The Pinellas County Center for the Arts program offers high-class and one-on-one training with students in varied art fields. The fields include literary theatre, performance theatre, musical theatre, technical theatre, visual arts, dance, instrumental music, and vocal music.

It now also has a new campus that opened to the students in the 2005–2006 school year. In 2006, however, the school was reported to be experiencing increased student defiance fueled by the racial divide in the student population.

Democratic Presidential Nominee and Illinois Senator Barack Obama visited the school for a town-hall style speech on August 1, 2008.

Gibbs became the first high school in Pinellas county to receive an "F" letter grade as of the 2009–2010 school year because of poor FCAT results. Less than one third of 9th and 10th graders were reading at grade level.

Notable alumni 

* Dave Anderson - Former professional baseball player (Los Angeles Dodgers, San Francisco Giants) and current Texas Rangers first base coach
 Boof Bonser - Current professional baseball player (Minnesota Twins, Boston Red Sox, Oakland Athletics)
 Trayvon Bromell – Track and field athlete
 Ed Charles - Former professional baseball player (Kansas City Athletics, New York Mets)
 Glen Edwards - Professional football

 Justin Hires - Comedian, actor, writer

 Shaun King - Professional  football
 Sierra Kusterbeck - Female vocalist for the alternative band VersaEmerge
 Jeff Lacy - Professional boxer
 James Howard Meredith - first African American to enroll at the University of Mississippi; civil rights leader 
 Nate Oliver - Former professional baseball player (Los Angeles Dodgers, San Francisco Giants, New York Yankees, Chicago Cubs)
 Scott Sanders - TV, film and stage producer
 Marreese Speights - Professional basketball
 Ephraim Sykes - Actor, dancer, musician
 Daniel Ulbricht - Dancer with New York City Ballet
 Ronald "Winky" Wright - Professional boxer

See also 
 Gibbs Junior College

References

External links 
 

Educational institutions established in 1927
High schools in Pinellas County, Florida
Public high schools in Florida
1927 establishments in Florida
Historically segregated African-American schools in Florida